is a town located in Oshima Subprefecture, Hokkaido, Japan.

As of September 2016, the town has an estimated population of 4,448, and a density of 20 persons per km². The total area is 221.88 km².

Geography
Kikonai is located on the southwest of the Oshima Peninsula and faces Tsugaru Strait.

Neighboring towns
 Oshima Subprefecture
 Hokuto
 Shiriuchi
 Hiyama Subprefecture
 Kaminokuni
 Assabu

Climate

History
1902: Kikonai village was founded.
1942: Kikonai village became Kikonai town.
2012: Hokkaido Kikonai High School was closed.

Transportation
Kikonai's station, Kikonai Station, is located at the north end of the Seikan Tunnel, which connects the islands of Hokkaido and Honshū. The town government is actively promoting the development of the Hokkaidō Shinkansen and proposes offering intermodal service on the line.

Matsumae Line used to run from Kikonai but it was abolished in 1988. The section of Esashi Line from Kikonai to Esashi was also abolished in May 2014.

Esashi Line: Kamaya - Izumisawa - Satsukari - Kikonai ( - Oshima-Tsuruoka - Yoshibori)
Kaikyō Line: Kikonai

Sister city
Tsuruoka, Yamagata, Japan (since 1989)

References

External links

Official Website 

 
Towns in Hokkaido